Sidney White House is a historic home located at Preston Hollow in Albany County, New York.  It was built about 1841 and consists of a main block with addition.  The main block is a five bay, two story gable ended building with a medium pitched roof.  The addition, originally a wood shed, is one and one half stories in height with a medium pitched roof.  It is of heavy timber-frame construction on a rubblestone foundation.  Interior treatments are Greek Revival in style.

It was listed on the National Register of Historic Places in 2005.

References

Houses on the National Register of Historic Places in New York (state)
Greek Revival houses in New York (state)
Houses completed in 1841
Houses in Albany County, New York
National Register of Historic Places in Albany County, New York